Ogedegbe is a Nigerian surname. Notable people with the surname include:

Best Ogedegbe (1954–2009), Nigerian footballer
Gbenga Ogedegbe, Nigerian American physician

Surnames of Nigerian origin